The Municipality of Lovrenc na Pohorju is a municipality in northeastern Slovenia. It lies in the Pohorje Hills to the west of Maribor. The area is part of the traditional region of Styria. It is now included in the Drava Statistical Region. The settlement of Lovrenc na Pohorju is the seat of the municipality.

Settlements
In addition to the municipal seat of Lovrenc na Pohorju, the municipality also includes the following settlements:
 Činžat
 Kumen
 Puščava
 Rdeči Breg
 Recenjak
 Ruta

References

External links
 
 Municipality of Lovrenc na Pohorju on Geopedia
 Lovrenc na Pohorju municipal site

Lovrenc na Pohorju